Kittson Fahey is an Australian sketch comedy television series that was first screened on the ABC between 1992 and 1993. The series starred Jean Kittson and Mary-Anne Fahey with a supporting cast that included David Swann and Phillip Scott.

References

External links
 

Australian comedy television series
Australian Broadcasting Corporation original programming
1992 Australian television series debuts
1993 Australian television series endings